Silent Years is a 1921 American silent drama film directed by Louis J. Gasnier and starring Rose Dione, Tully Marshall and  George A. McDaniel.

Cast
 Rose Dione as 	Mam'selle Jo Morey
 Tully Marshall as 	Captain Longville
 George A. McDaniel as Henry Langley
 George Siegmann as Pierre Gavot
 Will Jim Hatton as Young Tom Gavot
 Jack Mower as 	Tom Gavot
 James O. Barrows as 	Father Mantelle
 Jack Livingston as 	James Norvall
 Ruth King as 	Mary Malden
 Kate Toncray as 	Marcel Longville
 Lillian Rambeau as Mrs. Lindsay
 Jean O'Rourke as 	Young Donelle
 Ruth Ashby as Mrs. Norval

References

Bibliography
 Connelly, Robert B. The Silents: Silent Feature Films, 1910-36, Volume 40, Issue 2. December Press, 1998.
 Munden, Kenneth White. The American Film Institute Catalog of Motion Pictures Produced in the United States, Part 1. University of California Press, 1997.

External links
 

1921 films
1921 drama films
1920s English-language films
American silent feature films
Silent American drama films
American black-and-white films
Films directed by Louis J. Gasnier
Film Booking Offices of America films
1920s American films